The RRAB-3 ("rotationally dispersing aviation bomb"), nicknamed the Molotov bread basket, was a Soviet-made droppable bomb dispenser that combined a large high-explosive charge with a cluster of incendiary bombs. It was used against the cities of Finland during the Winter War of 1939–1940.

Described by journalist John Langdon-Davies in 1940:

As it fell from an aircraft, a small turbine on the nose turned to release a spring-loaded casing which, on opening, scattered 100 or more incendiary bombs; the main HE charge in the tail of the weapon continued to fall as a conventional bomb.

Other descriptions make no mention of a main charge and instead describe a large cylinder with vanes at the back that open out when the weapon is dropped. The vanes cause the bomb to spin and this has the effect of opening the sides and scattering the submunitions by centrifugal force.

The name comes from an urban legend, according to which Soviet Foreign Minister Vyacheslav Molotov claimed that the Soviet Union was not dropping bombs on Finland, but merely "airlifting food" to "starving" Finns. There is no record of these claims actually being made. The Finns due to this misinformation "sarcastically" dubbed the RRAB-3 cluster bomb "Molotov's bread basket." Consequently, the improvised incendiary device that Finns used to counter Soviet tanks was named the "Molotov cocktail", "a drink to go with the food."

This description seems to have become common currency among the British public in 1940. During the Bristol Blitz, the locals dubbed a similar German device "Goering's bread basket".

The Soviets had several versions: RRAB-1, RRAB-2 and RRAB-3, with capacities of 1000, 500 and 250 kg respectively, each capable of holding various types of submunitions including HE, incendiary, and chemical.

The bomb consisted of a cylinder that was 2.25 meters long and 0.9 meters in diameter.

See also 
 Cluster bomb
 Bombing of Helsinki in World War II

References 

Incendiary weapons
Cluster munition
Finland–Soviet Union relations
World War II weapons of the Soviet Union
World War II weapons
Bombs
Military equipment introduced in the 1930s